Cayuga Springs is an unincorporated community and census-designated place (CDP) in Delaware County, Oklahoma, United States. The population was 140 at the 2010 census, a 33.3 percent increase over the figure of 105 recorded in 2000.

It was established on the Elk River in the old Seneca Reserve in Indian Territory. The Cayuga Springs Post Office existed from June 11, 1884, until April 30, 1905.

Geography
Cayuga Springs is located in northeastern Delaware County at  (36.6340558, -94.67942849999997). Its eastern edge follows the Missouri state line.

Demographics

As of the census of 2000, there were 105 people, 40 households, and 30 families residing in Cayuga Springs. The population density was 14.6 people per square mile (5.6/km2). There were 57 housing units at an average density of 7.9/sq mi (3.1/km2). The racial makeup of the community was 70.48% White, 6.67% Native American, and 22.86% from two or more races. Hispanic or Latino of any race were 1.90% of the population.

There were 40 households, out of which 37.5% had children under the age of 18 living with them, 67.5% were married couples living together, and 25.0% were non-families. 25.0% of all households were made up of individuals, and 15.0% had someone living alone who was 65 years of age or older. The average household size was 2.63 and the average family size was 3.13.

The age of the population was spread out, with 30.5% under the age of 18, 5.7% from 18 to 24, 26.7% from 25 to 44, 29.5% from 45 to 64, and 7.6% who were 65 years of age or older. The median age was 38 years. For every 100 females, there were 123.4 males. For every 100 females age 18 and over, there were 108.6 males.

The median income for a household in the CDP was $20,893, and the median income for a family was $32,083. Males had a median income of $28,438 versus $21,250 for females. The per capita income for the community was $15,743. There were 7.4% of families and 13.2% of the population living below the poverty line, including 37.5% of under eighteens and none of those over 64.

References

Further reading
Shirk, George H.; Oklahoma Place Names; University of Oklahoma Press; Norman, Oklahoma; 1987:  .

External links
 Cayuga at GhostTowns.com

Census-designated places in Delaware County, Oklahoma
Census-designated places in Oklahoma
Ghost towns in Oklahoma